{{DISPLAYTITLE:C10H13FN2O4}}
The molecular formula C10H13FN2O4 (molar mass: 244.22 g/mol) may refer to:

 Alovudine, also called fluorothymidine
 Fluorothymidine F-18 (FLT)

Molecular formulas